Kalvarija (that means, Calvary) may refer to:

Kalvarija, Lithuania, a city
Kalvarija Municipality, Lithuania
Kalvarija (hill), a hill in Maribor, Slovenia
Kalvarija (Zemun), a neighborhood in Belgrade, Serbia
Žemaičių Kalvarija, a town in Lithuania
Kalvarija (film), a film by Zvonimir Maycug

See also
Kalwaria (disambiguation)